Karl Joseph Niklas (born 1948) is the Liberty Hyde Bailey Professor emeritus in the Section of Plant Biology, School of Integrative Plant Science, at Cornell University. He is best known for his work on plant biomechanics, allometry, and functional morphology, and for his long-standing contributions to understanding plant evolutionary biology, particularly early land plant evolutionary diversification patterns and morphospaces.

Education 
Niklas completed his undergraduate studies at the City College of New York. He earned his Ph.D. in paleobiology from the University of Illinois in 1974. He carried out his post-doctoral work at Birkbeck College in London as a Fulbright-Hays Fellow.

Career 
Niklas was curator for the New York Botanical Garden. He joined the faculty at Cornell in 1978. In 1985 he was named full professor and appointed as a Liberty Hyde Bailey Professor in 2000. He is the author of over 400 peer-reviewed scientific papers and five major books, all published by the University of Chicago Press. Niklas has received numerous awards, including awards for teaching (e.g., he received the SUNY Chancellor's Award for teaching in 1995). He is a member of the Botanical Society of America and served as its President (2008 – 2009) and Editor-in-Chief of the American Journal of Botany (1995 – 2004).
Niklas was the first botanist to tabulate the temporal distributions of plant species in the fossil record to quantify land plant diversification patterns throughout the Phanerozoic, and he was among the first to use factor analysis to identify major floristic changes and turnover patterns in the fossil record.  Niklas is also the only person to construct a computer generated morphospace for early land plants to quantify how each simulated plant intercepts sunlight, copes with mechanical forces, conducts fluids, and sheds reproductive propagules.  Using a search algorithm, he was able to simulate patterns of morphological change that mimicked in all respects patterns observed in the fossil record.  Another facet of his work was the use of fluid mechanics to understand how wind pollinated plants trap airborne pollen grains.  Niklas’ more recent work has continued to focus on using physics, chemistry, and mathematics to quantify how physical factors dictate the spatial and temporal distributions of extant plants.  His books on biomechanics and plant allometry have stimulated a renaissance in the use of engineering and scaling principles to understand diverse phenomena, ranging from the relationship between plant growth rates and body mass and the effects of wind on the mechanical stability of trees to the distributions of above- and below-ground biomass in forested communities.  Niklas is also a celebrated and dedicated teacher and mentor.

Selected works

Books 
Plant Biomechanics, 1992
Plant Allometry: The Scaling of Form and Process, 1994
The Evolutionary Biology of Plants, 1997
Plant Physics, 2012 (co-authored with )
Plant Evolution: An Introduction to the History of Life, 2016

Awards and distinctions 
John Simon Guggenheim Fellowship
The Botanical Society of America’s Centennial Medal
Alexander von Humboldt Stiftung prize for senior USA scientists
Listed among the 300 best professors in the 2012 Princeton Review's The Best 300 Professors
Elected Fellow, American Academy of Arts and Sciences
Elected Fellow, American Association for the Advancement of Science

References 

1948 births
Living people
Botanical Society of America
Cornell University faculty
University of Illinois alumni
20th-century American botanists
21st-century American botanists